Federico López Camacho (March 26, 1962 – November 6, 2006), better known as Fico López, was a Puerto Rican professional basketball player. He was a member of the Mets de Guaynabo from 1981 to 1997.

Although he was born in Mexico, López represented the Puerto Rican national team. Together with his brother-in-law, Mario Morales, López won various championships in the Puerto Rican league.

Personal life
López was born in Mexico City, Mexico, to Cuban parents. His father, Federico López Sr. was a star of Cuban basketball during the 1940s and 1950s. López was one of the star players of the national team of Puerto Rico. He was part of the first national Puerto Rican team to win a game against a national United States team (in Mexico). As a member of the Puerto Rican team he participated at the 1988 Summer Olympics in Seoul, South Korea.

Death
López died in Guaynabo, Puerto Rico, on November 6, 2006. from an apparent heart attack while playing volleyball with his friends in Caparra Country Club, the court that bears his name and where he grew up in sports since the age of 8. López was 44 years old.

References

Statistics in BSN
Federico "Fico" Lopez, Federación de Baloncesto de Puerto Rico 

1962 births
2006 deaths
Baloncesto Superior Nacional players
Basketball players at the 1983 Pan American Games
Basketball players at the 1987 Pan American Games
Basketball players at the 1988 Summer Olympics
Basketball players at the 1991 Pan American Games
Basketball players at the 1992 Summer Olympics
Basketball players from Mexico City
Colegio San José alumni
Olympic basketball players of Puerto Rico
Pan American Games bronze medalists for Puerto Rico
Pan American Games gold medalists for Puerto Rico
Pan American Games medalists in basketball
Puerto Rican men's basketball players
1990 FIBA World Championship players
Puerto Rico men's national basketball team players
Point guards
Competitors at the 1994 Goodwill Games
Medalists at the 1987 Pan American Games
Medalists at the 1991 Pan American Games
1994 FIBA World Championship players